Brigade M was a Dutch right-wing nationalist Rock Against Communism-band from Sassenheim in the Bollenstreek. The driving force behind Brigade M had always been Tim Mudde.

The band was founded in 1995 out of the ashes of the hardcore band Opel Kadeath. Initially the band's set list was limited and there were only a few concerts held. Only a few years after the founding the band had an upsurge in the extreme right subcultures in Europe

Under the name 'Dirk' they rehearsed for a while in the Muziekhuis in Leiden. Soon several leftist groups started protesting against this. Alderman Alexander Pechtold decided though to let the group to continue to rehearse there because there were no legal means to deny them. Brigade M thanked him by composing the song Pechtold Houzee! ("Hail Pechtold!").

In 2003 the band's line up was thoroughly changed. The two members with the most extremist ideas were kicked out of the band by Mudde and afterwards Brigade M became more moderate right. National Socialism was put on the ash heap and National Bolshevism, Strasserism, metapolitics, people's nationalism, language purism, European unity and conservative criticism of society became the fundaments of the band. They also highlighted vegetarianism, alcoholism, fast food, the antifa (most notably with their song Lui, laf en lelijk, better known for the lyrics Antifa Ha Ha Ha) and the Arab–Israeli conflict (in which they side with the Palestinians) in their lyrics, which they themselves called "radical and nationalistic"

The band was dissolved in 2005 after their last CD Nationaal Revolutionair with the reason that their national-revolutionary ideas didn't get much credence with the nationalistic subcultures in Europe because most nationalists are too chauvinist.

Afterwards the band still performed now and then at special occasions until 2010.

Discography 
 'Promo' Holland (MCD)
 Boykot McDood (7")
 Diets-Deutsche Kameraden (Split CD with Stromschlag and Schutt und Asche)
 Trouw aan Rood, Wit, Blauw (CD)
 Ode aan de kazerne (7")
 Dutch Hungarian brotherhood (Split CD with Fehér Törvény)
 Nationaal-Revolutionair (CD)
 Nationalrevolutionär (CD)
 National Revolutionary (CD)

References

External links 
Website of Brigade M
Brigade M Discography at Discogs

Musical groups established in 1995
Musical groups disestablished in 2005
Musical groups from South Holland
Dutch anti-communists